The 2007–08 Saint Mary's Gaels men's basketball team represented Saint Mary's College of California in the 2007–08 college basketball season, coached by Randy Bennett for the 7th consecutive year. The Gaels competed in the West Coast Conference and played their home games at the McKeon Pavilion. They finished conference play with a record of 12–2 to place second. They reached the semifinal round of the 2008 West Coast Conference men's basketball tournament, but received an at-large bid to the 2008 NCAA Division I men's basketball tournament where they entered as the No. 10 seed South Region. The Gaels were beaten by No. 7 seed Miami (FL) in the opening round to end their season 25–7.

Roster

Schedule and results
Source
All times are Pacific

|-
!colspan=9 style=| Non-conference regular season

|-
!colspan=9 style=| WCC regular season

|-
!colspan=9 style=| WCC tournament

|-
!colspan=10 style=| NCAA tournament

Rankings

References

Saint Mary's
Saint Mary's Gaels men's basketball seasons
Saint Mary's
Saint Mary's Gaels men's basketball
Saint Mary's Gaels men's basketball